The 2019–20 Japan Figure Skating Championships were held in Shibuya, Tokyo from December 18–22, 2019. It was the 88th edition of the event. Medals were awarded in the disciplines of men's singles, ladies' singles, pair skating, and ice dance. The results were part of the Japanese selection criteria for the 2020 World Championships, the 2020 Four Continents Championships, and the 2020 World Junior Championships.

Qualifying
Competitors either qualified at regional and sectional competitions, held from September to November 2019, or earned a bye.

Entries

Senior
A list of preliminary entries was published in December 2019. Names with an asterisk (*) denote junior skaters.

Junior
The top six finishers at the Japan Junior Championships in men's and ladies' singles were added to the Japan Championships. The fourth-place finisher in ladies, Momoka Hatasaki, was a novice skater and not eligible for the senior Championships, resulting in seventh-place finisher Chisato Uramatsu being bumped up in her place.

Changes to preliminary entries

Medal summary

Senior

Junior

Results

Men

Ladies

Pairs

Ice dance

Japan Junior Figure Skating Championships
The 2019–20 Junior Championships were held on November 15–17, 2019 in Yokohama, Kanagawa. There was no junior pairs competition.

Men

Ladies

Ice dance

International team selections

World Championships
The 2020 World Figure Skating Championships were held in Montreal, Quebec, Canada from March 16–22, 2020. Japan Skating Federation announced the team on December 22, 2019.

Four Continents Championships
The 2020 Four Continents Figure Skating Championships will be held in Seoul, South Korea from February 4–9, 2020. JSF announced the team on December 22, 2019.

World Junior Championships
Commonly referred to as "Junior Worlds", the 2020 World Junior Figure Skating Championships took place in Tallinn, Estonia from March 2–8, 2020. Junior national champions Yuma Kagiyama and Mana Kawabe earned automatic berths and were named to the team on November 17, 2019. The remainder of the team was determined by JSF following the senior championships, and was named on December 22, 2019.

Winter Youth Olympics
The 2020 Winter Youth Olympics will be held in Lausanne, Switzerland from January 10–15, 2020. The Japan Skating Federation announced the entries on November 17, 2019.

References

Japan Figure Skating Championships
Japan Championships
Figure Skating Championships